Idiolophorhynchus andriashevi, the pineapple whiptail or pineapple rattail, is a species of rattail found along the western and southern coasts of Australia and around New Zealand.

References

External links
 Fishes of Australia : Idiolophorhynchus andriashevi

Macrouridae

Marine fish of Southern Australia
Marine fish of New Zealand
pineapple whiptail